César Povolny, also known as Czeslaw Povolny and listed as Martin Povolny (born 19 July 1914, date of death unknown), was a German-French association footballer. He played for Le Havre AC.

International career
Povolny was born in Recklinghausen to parents of Polish descent, and emigrated to France. Povolny was selected for the 1938 FIFA World Cup, but did not earn any caps for the France national football team.

References

1914 births
Year of death missing
People from Recklinghausen
Sportspeople from Münster (region)
French footballers
German footballers
French people of Polish descent
German people of Polish descent
German emigrants to France
Le Havre AC players
1938 FIFA World Cup players
Association football defenders
Footballers from North Rhine-Westphalia